Charles Eusèbe Casgrain (August 3, 1825 – March 8, 1907) was an Ontario physician and political figure. He was a Conservative member of the Senate of Canada for Windsor division from 1887 to 1907.

He was born Charles-Eugène Casgrain in Quebec City, Lower Canada in 1825, the son of Charles-Eusèbe Casgrain, and studied at the College of St. Anne's and McGill College, graduating as an MD. He entered practice at Detroit in 1851 and married Charlotte Mary Chase in the same year, but moved to Sandwich (later Windsor) in 1856. He was also appointed coroner for Essex County. Casgrain was surgeon for the local militia during the Fenian raids. He served as a member of the town council for Windsor and as a long-time member of the local school board. He was named a knight of the Order of the Holy Sepulchre by Pope Leo XIII in 1884. Casgrain was also president of the Saint-Jean-Baptiste Society of Essex.

Casgrain was named to the Senate in 1887 and died in office in 1907.

His brother Philippe-Baby served as a member of the Canadian House of Commons and his brother Henri-Raymond was a Quebec priest and historian. His son Thomas became a lawyer and later served in the House of Commons.

References
 
 

A Cyclopæedia of Canadian biography : being chiefly men of the time ..., GM Rose (1886)

1825 births
1907 deaths
Canadian senators from Ontario
Conservative Party of Canada (1867–1942) senators
People of the Fenian raids
Knights of the Holy Sepulchre
Canadian coroners